= BioNumbers =

Database of quantitative data in biology

Content
- Description: Database of quantitative data in molecular and cell biology

Contact
- Laboratory: Milo lab
- Primary citation: PMID 19854939
- Release date: 2007

Access
- Website: bionumbers.hms.harvard.edu

BioNumbers is a free-access database of quantitative data in biology designed to provide the scientific community with access to the large amount of data now generated in the biological literature. The database aims to make quantitative values more easily available, to aid fields such as systems biology.

The BioNumbers project performs literature-based curation of various sources. It is a regularly updated online resource that contains >13,000 entries from ~1,000 distinct references. Examples of data include transcription and translation rates, organism and organelle sizes, metabolites concentrations and growth rates. Entries are provided with full reference and details such as measurement method and comments.

BioNumbers also publishes a monthly review of a problem in quantitative biology.

== History ==
BioNumbers was created as a Wikipedia-format community collaborative initiative in 2007 by Ron Milo, Paul Jorgensen and Mike Springer at the Systems Biology Department at Harvard Medical School. It is currently managed and curated at the Milo Lab from the Weizmann Institute of Science.

The database is funded by the Systems Biology Department at Harvard Medical School, and Weizmann Institute of Science.
